Bhandiwad is a village in Dharwad district of Karnataka, India. The village is known for a Hanuman temple.

References

Villages in Dharwad district